Mariana Arnal (born 17 August 1973) is an Argentine former field hockey player who competed in the 1996 Summer Olympics.

References

External links
 

1973 births
Living people
Las Leonas players
Argentine female field hockey players
Female field hockey goalkeepers
Olympic field hockey players of Argentina
Field hockey players at the 1996 Summer Olympics
Place of birth missing (living people)
Pan American Games medalists in field hockey
Pan American Games gold medalists for Argentina
Field hockey players at the 1995 Pan American Games
Medalists at the 1995 Pan American Games